Nature Cell Biology is a monthly peer-reviewed scientific journal published by Nature Portfolio. It was established in 1999. The founding editor was Annette Thomas. The current editor-in-chief is Christina Kary.

According to the Journal Citation Reports, the journal has a 2021 impact factor of 28.213.

References

External links 
 

Publications established in 1999
Nature Research academic journals
Monthly journals
Molecular and cellular biology journals